Autumn Laing is a 2011 novel by the Australian author Alex Miller.

Awards and nominations

 Winner, Melbourne Prize for Literature 2012
 Shortlisted, 2012 Prime Minister's Literary Award for Fiction
 Shortlisted, 2011 Manning Clark House National Cultural Awards (Individual category)
 Shortlisted, 2012 Adelaide Festival Awards for Literature Fiction Award
 Shortlisted, 2012 Queensland Literary Awards

Reviews
 Morag Fraser, 2011, 'A Space of Its Own Creation, Alex Miller's Indispensable New Novel', "Australian Book Review", accessed 1 July 2013.
 Janine Burke, 2011, 'Autumn Laing by Alex Miller', "The Monthly" , accessed 1 July 2013.
 Andrew Stephens, 2011, 'Leave It to Autumn', "The Age" 1 , accessed 1 July 2013.

References

 Alex Miller, 2011, 'How I Came to Write Autumn Laing', "Meanjin" , accessed 1 July 2013.

Novels by Alex Miller
2011 Australian novels
Allen & Unwin books